A list of films produced in Brazil ordered by year and split onto separate pages by decade. For an alphabetical list of films currently on Wikipedia see :Category:Brazilian films

1908–1919
Brazilian films: 1908–1919

1920s
Brazilian films of the 1920s

1930s
Brazilian films of the 1930s

1940s
Brazilian films of the 1940s

1950s
Brazilian films of the 1950s

1960s
Brazilian films of the 1960s

1970s
Brazilian films of the 1970s

1980s
Brazilian films of the 1980s

1990s
Brazilian films of the 1990s

2000s
Brazilian films of the 2000s

2010s
Brazilian films of the 2010s

2020s
Brazilian films of 2020
Brazilian films of 2021
Brazilian films of 2022
Brazilian films of 2023

See also
List of years in Brazil
List of years in Brazilian television

External links
 Brazilian film at the Internet Movie Database